Torres (sometimes Torrez) is a surname in the Catalan, Portuguese, and Spanish languages, meaning "towers".

History

A surname derived from any of several towns called Torres, plural of torre (tower), from Latin "turris." Torres is the 50th most common surname in the United States and the 11th most common Spanish surname. It is a common surname in Puerto Rico, Dominican Republic, Spain, Portugal, Colombia, Peru, Cuba, Mexico, Venezuela and the Philippines, among others. In Italy, among other countries, it is found as a Sephardic surname.

People with the surname

Athletes
 Abraham Torres, Venezuelan boxer
 Albert Torres, Spanish racing cyclist
 Andrés Torres, Puerto Rican baseball player
 Arturo Torres (soccer), American soccer player
 Aureliano Torres, Paraguayan footballer
 Carlos Alberto Torres, Brazilian footballer
 Carolina Torres, Chilean pole vaulter
 Dara Torres, American swimmer
 Dilson Torres, Venezuelan baseball player
 Erick Torres, Peruvian footballer
 Eve Torres (born 1984), American professional wrestler
 Facundo Torres, Uruguayan footballer
 Félix Ricardo Torres, Paraguayan footballer
 Fernando Torres (born 1984), Spanish footballer
 Ferran Torres, Spanish footballer
 Francisco Javier Torres, Mexican footballer
 Georgie Torres, Puerto Rican basketball player
 Gleyber Torres, Venezuelan baseball player
 Héctor Torres, Mexican baseball player
 Leonardo Torres Quevedo, Spanish engineer
 Joe Torres (baseball) (born 1982), American baseball coach
 Johnny Torres, American soccer player
 José Torres (1936–2009), Puerto Rican boxer
 José Torres (1938–2010), Portuguese footballer and coach
 José Francisco Torres, American soccer player
 Juan Francisco Torres, Spanish footballer
 Macnelly Torres, Colombian footballer
 Marco Torrès, French gymnast
 Mariano Torres, Argentine footballer
 Miguel Angel Torres (born 1981), American MMA fighter
 Miguel Torres Gómez, Spanish footballer
 Mike Torres, Dominican basketball player
 Norbert Torres (born 1990), Filipino-Canadian basketball player
 Óscar Torres (basketball), Venezuelan basketball player
 Pau Torres (born 1997), Spanish footballer
 Raffi Torres, Canadian ice hockey player
 Raymundo Torres (boxer), Mexican boxer
 Raymundo Torres (footballer), Mexican footballer
 Roger Torres, Colombian footballer
 Salomón Torres, Dominican baseball player
 Sandra Torres, Argentine marathon runner
 Sergio Torres (born 1981), Argentine footballer
 Tecia Torres, American mixed martial artist
 Todd Torres, Puerto Rican swimmer
 Xavi Torres, Spanish footballer
 Richard Torrez (born 1999), American professional boxer

Performers and media figures
 Albert Torres, Puerto Rican American salsa dancer and promoter
 Antonio Torres Jurado, Spanish guitarist and guitar maker
 Bartolomé de Torres Naharro, Spanish dramatist
 Coraima Torres, Venezuelan actress
 Dayanara Torres, Puerto Rican actress
 Diego Torres, Argentinian pop singer
 Eddie Torres, Puerto Rican American salsa dance instructor
 Eugenio Torres Villarreal, Mexican professional wrestler, television host and rapper
 Fernanda Torres, Brazilian actress
 Fernando Torres, Brazilian actor
 Gina Torres, Cuban American actress
 Guillermo José Torres, Puerto Rican American TV reporter
 Joe Torres, American TV actor
 José Torres, Cuban-Polish musician and percussionist
 Judy Torres, Puerto Rican American pop musician and dancer
 Liz Torres, American actress, singer and comedian
 Néstor Torres, Puerto Rican jazz flautist
 Rawy Torres, Puerto Rican musician
 Roberto Torres, Cuban musician
 Samantha Torres, Spanish model
 Tico Torres, Cuban American musician and Bon Jovi drummer
 Tommy Torres, Puerto Rican musician
 Torres, stagename of American musician Mackenzie Scott
 Eduardo Serrano Torres, Venezuelan composer
 Xavier Enrique Torres, Puerto Rican actor

Artists and writers
 Alberto Torres, Brazilian social thinker
 Andrés Torres Queiruga, Galician theologian, writer and translator
 Angelo Torres, American cartoonist
 Ben Fong-Torres, American rock journalist
 Diego de Torres Vargas, Puerto Rican historian
 Diego de Torres Villarroel, Spanish writer
 Edwin Torres, American/Puerto Rican poet
 Félix González-Torres, Cuban artist
 Joaquín Torres García, Uruguayan artist
 Julio Romero de Torres, Spanish painter
 Raymunda Torres y Quiroga, Argentine writer and women's rights activist
 Tanya Torres, Puerto Rican artist, author, and poet
 Tereska Torrès, French novelist

Politicians and public figures
 Abdelkhalek Torres, journalist and nationalist leader in Morocco
 Art Torres, American politician
 Camilo Torres Restrepo, Colombian Roman Catholic priest
 Camilo Torres Tenorio, Colombian politician
 Edwin Torres, American state supreme court judge
 Esteban Edward Torres, Californian politician
 Henri Torrès, French trial lawyer, politician, and writer
 Hugo Torres Jiménez, Nicaraguan activist
 Jaime Torres Bodet, Mexican politician
 Juan José Torres, Bolivian President
 Lucy Torres, Filipino politician
 Manuel Torres, first Colombian ambassador to the United States
 Manuel Montt Torres, Chilean statesman and scholar
 Raul Torres, American politician
 Ritchie Torres, American politician
 Ruben Torres, Filipino politician
 Sandra Torres, Guatemalan politician and former First Lady.

Scientists and explorers
 Belindo Adolfo Torres, Argentinian entomologist
 Carlos Torres, Chilean astronomer
 Leonardo Torres y Quevedo, Spanish engineer and mathematician
 Luis Vaz de Torres, Spanish explorer of the Pacific

Criminals 

 Raúl Meza Torres (1991–2010), Mexican suspected assassin
 Manuel Torres Félix (1958–2010), Mexican suspected drug lord
 Javier Torres Félix (1960), Mexican convicted drug lord

Other
 Chumel Torres, Mexican comedian
 Fernando Torres de Portugal y Mesía, the 16th-century viceroy
 Jacques Torres, French pastry chef
 Susan Torres, American woman who gave birth while brain dead
 Tomás de Torres, Portuguese astrologer

Fictional characters
 Adam Torres, a character in Degrassi: The Next Generation
 B'Elanna Torres, a character in Star Trek: Voyager
 Callie Torres, a character in Grey's Anatomy
 Diego Torres, a character in the Netflix series 13 Reasons Why
 Drew Torres, a character in Degrassi: The Next Generation
 Eva "Papi" Torres, a character in The L Word
 Eddie Torres, a character in New York Undercover
 Izzie Torres, a character in Doctors
 Lisa Torres, a character in Doctors
 Pépé Torres, the young killer in John Steinbeck's 1938 short story Flight (Steinbeck story)
 Nick Torres, a special agent from NCIS
 Fabiola Torres, a character from Never Have I Ever
 Drea Torres, a character in Netflix Original Do Revenge

See also 
Luis Torres (disambiguation), several people

References

Portuguese-language surnames
Sephardic surnames
Spanish-language surnames
Surnames of Spanish origin
Surnames of Colombian origin